Miss World 1997, the 47th edition of the Miss World pageant, was held on 22 November 1997 at the Plantation Club Seychelles in Baie Lazare, Seychelles. 86 delegates competed for the coveted crown. At the end of the event, India's Diana Hayden came out victorious. Hayden went on to win the Miss World 1997 pageant at the age of 24 crowned by Miss World 1996, Irene Skliva. It was the first time the Miss World pageant was held in the Seychelles. She became the third Indian woman to win Miss World since Reita Faria in 1966 and Aishwarya Rai in 1994.

Results

Placements

Continental Queens of Beauty

Contestants

  – Taisha Regina Gomes
  – Natalia Pombo
  – Michella Laclé Croes
  – Laura Csortan
  – Susanne Nagele
  – Alveta Adderley
  – Sandrine Corman
  – Mitzy Suárez Saucedo
  – Elma Terzić
  – Mpule Kwelagobe
  – Fernanda Rambo Agnes
  – Zoe Jennifer Walcott
  – Simona Velitchkova
  – Keri-Lynn Power
  – Carmelinda Gonçalves
  – Cassandra Powell
  – Paulina Mladinic
  – Gladys Buitrago Caicedo
  – Rebeca Escalante Trejas
  – Martina Novosel
  – Galatia Charalambidou
  – Terezie Dobrovolná
  – Carolina Estrella Peña
  – Clío Olaya Frías
  – Amel Shawky Soliman
  – Mairit Roonsar
  – Minna Lehtinen
  – Laure Belleville
  – Katja Glawe
  – Benita Sena Golomeke
  – Rosanna Ressa
  – Eugenia Limantzaki
  – Lourdes Mabel Valencia Bobadilla
  – Sonja Aldina Silva
  – Hansel Cristina Cáceres Teruel
  – Vivian Lee Ming-Wai
  – Beata Petes
  – Diana Hayden
  – Andrea Roche
  – Mirit Greenberg
  – Irene Lippi
  – Michelle Moodie
  – Shinobu Saraie
  – Kim Jin-ah
  – Liga Graudumniece
  – Joëlle Behlock
  – Asta Vyšniauskaitė
  Macau  – Agnes Lo Vai Van
  – Arianna Teoh
  – Sarah Vella
  – Blanca Soto
  – Sheya Shipanga
  – Jharana Bajracharya
  – Lauralee Martinovich
  – Charlotte Høiåsen
  – Patricia Aurora Bremner Hernández
  – Mariela Quiñónez García
  – Claudia María Luque Barrantas
  – Kristine Rachel Florendo
  – Roksana Jonek
  – Icilia Silva Berenguel
  – Aurea Isis Marrero Nieves
  – Liudmila Popova
  – Michelle Lane
  – Jasmine Wong
  – Marietta Senkacová
  – Maja Šimec
  – Jessica Motaung
  – Nuria Avellaneda Gallego
  – Xoliswa Mkhonta
  – Sofia Joelsson
  – Tanja Gutmann
  – Saida Joy Kessys Sashays
  – Tanya Suesuntisook
  – Fang Su-Ling
  – Mandy Jagdeo
  – Çağla Şıkel
  – Lillian Acom
  – Kseniya Kuz'menko
  – Vicki-Lee Walberg
  – Sallie Toussaint
  – Ana González Kwasny
  – Christina Dieckmann
  – Tamara Šaponjić
  – Tukuza Tembo
  – Una Patel

Notes

Debuts

Returns

Last competed in 1990:
 
Last competed in 1993:
 
 
 
Last competed in 1995:

Withdrawals
  - Miss Curaçao World 1997, Jeameane Colastica did not compete due lack of time and preparation. She went next year inserted.
  – No contest.
  – Harpa Lind Hardardottir
  – Adanma Evoh - Due to sponsorship scheduling problems and political conflict.
  - Jamila Bisembieva - Due to sponsorship problems.

Replacements
  - Kerishnie Naicker - Due personal problems. She went next year to Miss Universe 1998 and Miss World 1998 where become Top 5 and Queen of Africa.

Other Notes
  – Mpule Kwelagobe went on to compete in Miss Universe 1999 held in Chaguaramas, Trinidad and Tobago after two years and won the crown.

References

External links
 Pageantopolis – Miss World 1997

Miss World
1997 beauty pageants
1997 in Seychelles
Beauty pageants in Seychelles
November 1997 events in Africa